Clutts may refer to:

Clutts, Kentucky, a community in Harlan County
Tyler Clutts, an American football fullback
The Clutts House, a historic residence in Wellston, Jackson County, Ohio